Camptotoma is a genus of ground beetles in the family Carabidae. There are five described species in Camptotoma, found in South America.

Camptotoma is the sole genus in the subfamily Chaetogenyini.

Species
These five species belong to the genus Camptotoma:
 Camptotoma flavostriata Reichardt, 1967  (Brazil)
 Camptotoma freyi Nègre, 1966  (Venezuela)
 Camptotoma lebasii Reiche, 1843  (Colombia)
 Camptotoma marcuzzii Nègre, 1966  (Venezuela)
 Camptotoma straneoi (Emden, 1958)  (Brazil and Paraguay)

References

Licininae